Matthew Wolfenden (born 5 May 1980) is an English actor best known for his role as David Metcalfe in the British soap opera Emmerdale.

Early life
Wolfenden was born in Norwood Green, West Yorkshire. He was educated at Brighouse High School.

Wolfenden was a member of the British gymnastics squad until, aged 16, he fell whilst practising on the rings and broke his back. This prevented him from continuing gymnastics and he turned to acting.

Acting career
Before becoming part of the Emmerdale cast, Wolfenden was a cast member in the musical Saturday Night Fever.

Emmerdale
Wolfenden plays David Metcalfe, son of Eric Pollard, in ITV's Emmerdale. His first acting job was as an extra on the programme, later he originally auditioned for the role of Eli Dingle, but lost out to Joseph Gilgun; then he was called back for the role of David Metcalfe.

Hollyoaks: Let Loose
Wolfenden has also appeared in Hollyoaks: Let Loose, a spin-off of Hollyoaks.

Soapstar Superstar
In early 2007, Wolfenden finished ninth on the second series of Soapstar Superstar. He performed the songs "Bad Day" (Daniel Powter) and "Don't Stop Me Now" (Queen).

Dancing on Ice
Wolfenden was partnered with Russian ice dancer Nina Ulanova for the seventh series of Dancing on Ice. His gymnastic and dance background proved to be an advantage and he ended up in the final, against Hollyoaks actress Jorgie Porter and The X Factor contestant Chico Slimani. Wolfenden continued his role in Emmerdale  while training for Dancing on Ice. Matthew became the "King of the Ice" after beating Porter.

Other work
Wolfenden has appeared on several chat shows with various  co-stars including Natalie Anderson and Fiona Wade. On 7 January 2014, Wolfenden provided the soap news on ITV's This Morning, a topic usually covered by journalist and writer Sharon Marshall.

On 12 April 2015, Wolfenden appeared on a celebrity special of the game show The Chase. He advanced to the final of game with fellow contestant Lesley Joseph and they won the show, taking home £5500 each for their respective charities of choice, Wolfenden's being Speak Up, a charity for adults' with learning disabilities.

On 11 September 2016, Wolfenden, alongside Emmerdale co-star Eden Taylor-Draper, took part in the Great North Run to raise funds for Bloodwise.

Personal life
Wolfenden is married to his Emmerdale co-star Charley Webb and the couple have three sons.  Wolfenden proposed to Webb on Christmas Day in 2009. They married in February 2018, and have three sons together; their third son was born on 26 July 2019.

Awards and nominations

References

External links

1980 births
Living people
English male soap opera actors
People from Halifax, West Yorkshire
Reality show winners
People educated at Brighouse High School